Official Detective is an American anthology television series which aired in syndication from 1957 to March 19, 1958. The series was hosted by veteran film actor Everett Sloane.

Overview 

The production of the first pilot was announced in December 1956. The story dealt with the slaying of a woman where the main challenge is to identify the body.

The series was written and produced by Mort Briskin for Desilu Productions and National Telefilm Associates in cooperation with Official Detective magazine. Around 40 episodes were produced, and these aired on the NTA Film Network between July 1957 and April 1958. Producer Mort Briskin would go on to produce other series for NTA and Desilu. The episodes of Official Detective are archived at the UCLA Film and Television Archive in Los Angeles.

Desilu employed professional detectives as technical advisers to ensure that procedures depicted in the program accurately represented real-life police work. Scripts were adapted from articles published in Official Detective magazine, and officials at the magazine reviewed the scripts' content for accuracy.

References

External links

Official Detective at CVTA with episode link

1957 American television series debuts
1958 American television series endings
1950s American anthology television series
American detective television series
Black-and-white American television shows
English-language television shows
First-run syndicated television programs in the United States
Television series by CBS Studios
Television series by Desilu Productions